In mathematics and physics, pregeometry has several meanings:
 Pregeometry (model theory), another name for a matroid
 Pregeometry (physics), a structure from which geometry arises